Barricade is a 1939 adventure film directed by Gregory Ratoff and starring Alice Faye, Warner Baxter, Charles Winninger, Arthur Treacher, and Keye Luke.

Plot
A singer named Emmy meets broken-down journalist Hank Topping while travelling across Mongolia by train. A romance sparks, but is soon interrupted by a fierce group of murderous bandits. Fleeing, Emmy and Hank team up with others, eventually culminating in a fierce shootout with the marauders.  A youngster of ten years, the Emmy and Hank team seek safety in a small fort or an antiquated country home located on barren lands.  As the bandits approach, they hide in a basement level, protected only by a floorboard cover.  As the bandits enter the building, the baby of Emmy and Hank begins to cry, thereby revealing the location of the couple and their team.  As the bandits begin to chop their way through the floorboards, a rescue squad on motorcycles speeds over a nearby hill towards the building, then succeeding to rescue those trapped below the floor.

Cast
 Alice Faye as Emmy Jordan
 Warner Baxter  as Hank Topping
 Charles Winninger  as Samuel J. Cady
 Arthur Treacher as Upton Ward
 Keye Luke as Ling - Cady's Secretary
 Willie Fung as Yen - Cady's Major Domo
 Doris Lloyd as Mrs. Ward
 Eily Malyon as Mrs. Little - Head of Mission
 Joan Carroll as Winifred Ward (as Joan Carol)
 Leonid Snegoff as Boris - Russian Consul
 Philip Ahn as Col. Wai Kang
 Jonathan Hale	 as Assistant Secretary of State
 Moroni Olsen as Shanghai Managing Editor
 Harry Hayden	as Shanghai Telegraph Manager

Production
20th Century Fox considered the film mediocre and it was shelved. A year later, with actress Alice Faye's popularity booming, the film was released to expected sub-par success. There were extensive revisions and retakes which eliminated actors J. Edward Bromberg and Joseph Schildkraut from the cast. The song "There'll Be Other Nights" by Lew Brown and Lew Pollack, recorded by Alice Faye, was cut from the final print.

References

External links 
 
 
 
 

1939 films
20th Century Fox films
1930s adventure drama films
American adventure drama films
American black-and-white films
Films directed by Gregory Ratoff
Films scored by David Buttolph
Films set in China
Films set in Manchukuo
Films set in Mongolia
Films set on trains
1939 drama films
1930s English-language films
1930s American films